Mary Petty (April 29, 1899 – March 6, 1976) was an illustrator of books and magazines best remembered for a series of covers done for The New Yorker featuring her invented Peabody family.

Early life 
Mary Petty was born in Hampton, New Jersey, to Robert Davison Petty, a law professor at the New York Law School, and Florence Servis, a schoolteacher.

In 1922, Petty graduated from the Horace Mann School in New York City. She did not formally study art, but taught herself to draw.

Artistic career 
Petty met New Yorker cartoonist Alan Dunn around 1925 and he encouraged her to sell her work. Petty published her first drawing on October 22, 1927, in the New Yorker, which itself was only in its second year of publication. New Yorker publisher Harold Ross gave Petty's cartoons his top grade of "AAA."

Petty's style was characterized by her "gentle satirization of New York City's Victorian era society." She portrayed upper-class families in scenes of wealth and privilege. While somewhat satirical, her drawings were also affectionate. One family recurred in her drawings, to which she assigned the name "Peabody."

Petty was a naturally reticent person, and while her work began appearing in the lauded new magazine, Petty herself did not come to The New Yorker offices for some time and thus "for a long time nothing at all was known about her—except that she regularly submitted a new and distinctive kind of drawing." Even after becoming a part of the office scene, few knew her well. James Thurber said all he knew of her background was that she "was born in a brownstone house on West End Avenue. Her father was a professor. She did not have a particularly happy childhood. That's all, brother." Petty contributed to the New Yorker  for thirty-nine years, publishing 273 drawings and 38 covers. Her last New Yorker cover was published on March 19, 1966, and showed elderly "Mrs. Peabody" pulling on a broken calling cord.

Petty illustrated several books, including one of her New Yorker  cartoons, published in 1945.

Petty rarely took ideas from outside sources (only twice, according to Thurber).

Roz Chast, a New Yorker cartoonist from a later era, is a great fan and proudly owns "an ancient book by that early, inimitable cartoonist" (along with "vintage Steig, early Helen Hokinson, and, of course, all of Charles Addams"; 39).

Personal life 
On December 8, 1927, Petty and Alan Dunn (1900–1974) were married. They had no children.

Later life and death 
Petty was assaulted and beaten by a mugger on December 1, 1971, and was found three days after the incident on Ward's Island. She never wholly recovered and died five years later at the Pine Rest Nursing Home in Paramus, New Jersey.

References

External links
 Alan Dunn and Mary Petty Papers 1907-1972 at Syracuse University (primary source material)

1899 births
1976 deaths
American women cartoonists
American humorists
Horace Mann School alumni
The New Yorker cartoonists
Artists from New York City
Writers from New York City
Women humorists
American cartoonists
20th-century American women